"Mariners Apartment Complex" is a song by American singer-songwriter Lana Del Rey, released on September 12, 2018, through Polydor Records and Interscope Records, as the lead single from her sixth studio album, Norman Fucking Rockwell! (2019). The song was written and produced by Del Rey and musician Jack Antonoff, whom Del Rey would later go on to frequently collaborate with. A psychedelic folk and soft rock song with elements of country music, 
the song features a more refined and mellow sound for Del Rey compared to her previous records. Inspired to write the song after taking a late night walk with her then partner, while reaching an "apartment complex", lyrically, the song sees the narrator assuring a lover of constant support and guidance in their beautiful yet problematic relationship.

"Mariners Apartment Complex" received widespread critical acclaim, with reviewers praising the song's lyricism, production, and Del Rey's vocals. Commercially the song was a moderate success charting in over 15 countries.

Release
On September 7, 2018, Del Rey announced that she would be releasing two new songs, with "Mariners Apartment Complex" being released the following week. She subsequently shared a snippet of the song and its accompanying music video, which was shot by her sister, Chuck Grant. The song was released on September 12 after premiering on BBC Radio 1. In an interview preceding the premiere, Del Rey stated:

"The song is about this time I took a walk late at night with a guy I was seeing, and we stopped in front his friend's apartment complex, and he put his hand around my shoulder, and he said "I think we are together because we're both similar, like we're both really messed up" and I thought it was the saddest thing I'd ever heard. And I said, "I'm not sad, I didn't know that's why you thought you were relating to me on that level, I'm actually doing pretty good". And he was upset, and that's when I wrote the song. I thought, I had to do so many times, where you know like I had to sort of step on that role where I was showing the way and I was sort of being the brighter light. But that's why it's so cool that you’re playing it. 'Cause I thought that I'd just put it out and it would be one of those things that I'd put out just to have there for myself, but it's cool being able to share it with people too."

Music video 
A music video for "Mariners Apartment Complex" was released on September 18, 2018, six days after the song's release. The video was filmed by Del Rey's sister, Chuck Grant.

Composition
"Mariners Apartment Complex" was characterized by Rolling Stones Ryan Reed as a folky psychedelic song. Pitchfork critic Marc Hogan described the song as "a somber 1970s-style rock ballad with piano, acoustic guitar, and swooping strings." Mark Beaumont of NME called it "a classically Del Rey smoulder of silken acoustic country music and orchestral washes."

Critical reception
The song received widespread acclaim from music critics. Billboards Starr Bowenbank wrote that the song "features Del Rey's lush vocals against a beautiful backdrop of country-influenced guitar work, with her singing in wondrous whispers and dreamy layered harmonies about a beautiful, yet tumultuous, romance." In a review for Pitchfork, Marc Hogan stated that the song "posits a Lana Del Rey who is not only a fully rounded character but also a port in a storm, as recognizable and reassuring as the old AM radio staples the song updates." Rolling Stones Brittany Spanos opined that the song "feels like a spiritual sequel" to Leonard Cohen's "Chelsea Hotel #2", stating that "Negating her earliest works, growing out of her previous attitudes and forsaking the image of the Good American Girl looking for a figure to make her feel wanted, desired and cool, this Del Rey has 'become the daddy.'" Anna Gaca from Spin noted that Del Rey "asks your understanding... your forgiveness... your grace... and in return, she offers everything: her power as a cypher and her vulnerability as an individual, bottled up tight in the character of Lana Del Rey and cast into the waves."

Critics' lists
Rolling Stone and Consequence of Sound ranked "Mariners Apartment Complex" at number 6 and number 29 on their respective lists of the 50 Best Songs of 2018.

Credits and personnel

Lana Del Rey – vocals, songwriting, production
Jack Antonoff  – production, songwriting, drums, programming, acoustic guitar, electric guitar, keyboards, piano, recording engineering, mixing
 Laura Sisk – recording engineering, mixing, additional programming
Jon Sher – assistant recording engineering
 Serban Ghenea – mixing
 John Hanes – mix engineering
 Chris Gehringer – mastering
 Will Quinnell – assistant mastering engineering

Charts

Year-end charts

Release history

References

2010s ballads
2018 singles
2018 songs
Lana Del Rey songs
American country music songs
American rock songs
Country ballads
Folk ballads
Psychedelic songs
Psychedelic folk songs
Rock ballads
Song recordings produced by Jack Antonoff
Songs written by Jack Antonoff
Songs written by Lana Del Rey
Black-and-white music videos
Songs about California